Sarah McInerney (born 2 April 1981) is an Irish radio and TV presenter and reporter, notable for her work with RTÉ, TV3 / Virgin Media One and Newstalk, and a print journalist, notably having worked with the Sunday Tribune and the Sunday Times.  From County Galway and with a degree in journalism from Dublin City University, as of April 2021 she presents RTÉ's main commute-time radio programme, Drivetime, and is a co-presenter of RTÉ's flagship current affairs TV programme, Prime Time.

Early life and education
Born to two school teachers, and growing up in Barna, County Galway, McInerney attended Salerno Girls Secondary School in Salthill, Galway.  She then pursued a place at Dublin City University (DCU) for a four-year B.A. in Journalism - she has since said that this was by mistake, as she really wanted to learn how to write fiction.  Her course did include a term at Boston University studying fiction writing but her lecturer did not recommend a career as a general creative writer but as a playwright or actor. She finished her course in summer 2003, graduating later that year.

Career
McInerney completed a DCU work placement at the Sunday Tribune in 2003, in the second week of which she co-wrote a front-page piece, appearing with her name in the by-line. She has since said that she found that she was both well-prepared for the work, and after a few weeks, loved it.  She secured employment at the Tribune after graduation, initially on a temporary basis, then being made permanent, initially to produce a social diary, Sarah in the City, and then also as a news reporter.  In August 2008 she took up a post as a political reporter with the Sunday Times,ø working there for 7 years.

After 15 years in print journalism, McInerney began to be invited to broadcast panel discussions, notably at TV3, and she was headhunted to join Newstalk as co-host of their main weekday "drive time" programme, going freelance. Despite a lack of resources, she won the News Broadcaster of the Year national award but after about a year the programme was abruptly moved to a one-hour weekend slot, and she and her co-host left the station within a few months. This episode was discussed by Fintan O'Toole in an Irish Times piece, which accused Newstalk of sexism.

McInerney joined the current affairs unit at TV3, a part of Virgin Media Ireland, sometimes substituting for leading presenters such as Vincent Browne, a mentor of hers, on television, and taking on her own current affairs programme on Sundays.  She also wrote a book on the disappearances of women in the Wicklow Mountains, and worked on a documentary for the BBC.

McInerney moved to RTÉ Radio One, presenting a major daily current affairs show, Today with Sarah McInerney, from May to August 2020, and then moving to co-present the primary evening commute programme Drivetime from September 2020.  In March 2021 it was announced that McInerney would additionally become co-presenter of RTÉ's flagship current affairs programme, Prime Time, along with Fran McNulty, joining veteran Miriam O'Callaghan, and she debuted in this role on 6 April 2021 with a well-rated performance.

Personal life
McInerney is married to Thomas, an actuary, and they have two boys; they live in Sutton, a northern suburb of Dublin.

McInerney was given an Alumni Award by her alma mater, DCU, in 2018.  She is a voluntary advisory board member at the Centre for the Talented Youth of Ireland.

References

External links
 Extensive interview with Roisin Ingle of the Irish Times, April 2021

1981 births
People from County Galway
20th-century Irish people
Alumni of Dublin City University
Sunday Tribune people
20th-century Irish women writers
Irish columnists
Irish women columnists
Irish non-fiction writers
Irish women non-fiction writers
21st-century Irish people
Newstalk presenters
Virgin Media News newsreaders and journalists
RTÉ Radio 1 presenters
Irish broadcasters
Living people